Batesville Historic District may refer to:

Batesville Commercial Historic District, Batesville, Arkansas, listed on the NRHP in Arkansas
Batesville East Main Historic District, Batesville, Arkansas, listed on the NRHP in Arkansas
Batesville Historic District (Batesville, Mississippi), listed on the NRHP in Mississippi 
Batesville Historic District (Batesville, Virginia), listed on the NRHP in Virginia